Planica 1952 was an International ski jumping week with international competition on Srednja Bloudkova K80 hill, held on 23 March 1952 in Planica, PR Slovenia, FPR Yugoslavia. 5,000 people has gathered.

Schedule

Competitions
On 21 March 1952, first training was on schedule with 19 competitors on start. The longest jump was set by Rudi Finžgar at 75 metres.

On 22 March 1952, second training was on schedule with 21 competitors on start. The longest jump was set by Keith Wegeman from Hollywood at 81.5 metres.

On 23 March 1952, second international competition, with 25 competitors from Yugoslavia, Austria and United States on K80 normal hill was on schedule. Keith Wegeman won with 81 and 70.5 metres.

Training 1
21 March 1952 — Afternoon — incomplete

Training 2
22 March 1952 – Four rounds – incomplete  — longest jump

International competition

23 March 1952 — 10:30 AM — Two rounds — official results

References

1952 in Yugoslav sport
1952 in ski jumping
1952 in Slovenia
Ski jumping competitions in Yugoslavia
International sports competitions hosted by Yugoslavia
Ski jumping competitions in Slovenia
International sports competitions hosted by Slovenia